Ronald Max Hartwell (1921–2009) was an Australian-born liberal economic historian of the British Industrial Revolution.

Hartwell's first academic appointment was at University of New South Wales (1950–56), where he held the chair of economic history. This was followed by a readership in recent economic and social history at the University of Oxford, and then as a professorial fellow of Nuffield College, Oxford, 1956–77 (emeritus 1977). He served as the editor of the Economic History Review from 1960 through 1968.  From his retirement in 1977, Hartwell served as visiting professor of economics at the University of Virginia every fall semester into the early 1990s, and often spent the spring semester at the University of Chicago in a similar capacity.

His article "The Rising Standard of Living in England, 1800–1850" in the Economic History Review generated a great deal of controversy. Hartwell's view that industrialisation had immeasurably improved the lot of the poor was in contrast to the prevailing opinion, notably that of Eric Hobsbawm, which stressed the damaging economic effects industrialization on the poor.

He was a member and – from 1992 to 1994, president – of the Mont Pelerin Society.

Publications
The Economic Development of Van Diemen's Land, 1820–1850 (1954)
"The Rising Standard of Living in England, 1800–1850" (1961)
The causes of the Industrial Revolution in England (Introduction) (1967)
The Industrial Revolution and Economic Growth (1971)

References

Festschrifts 
 O'Brien, Patrick and Quinault, Roland. eds, (1993) The Industrial Revolution and British Society: Festschrift for R.M. Hartwell, Cambridge University Press
 James, John A. and Thomas, Mark eds (1994) Capitalism in context: essays on economic development and cultural change in honor of R.M. Hartwell, University of Chicago Press

1921 births
2009 deaths
Fellows of Nuffield College, Oxford
20th-century Australian historians
Australian emigrants to the United Kingdom